Podospora anserina is a filamentous ascomycete fungus from the order Sordariales. It is considered a model organism for the study of molecular biology of senescence (aging), prions, sexual reproduction, and meiotic drive. It has an obligate sexual and pseudohomothallic (i.e. it can perform selfing) life cycle. It is a non-pathogenic coprophilous fungus that colonizes the dung of herbivorous animals such as horses, rabbits, cows and sheep.

Taxonomy 
Podospora anserina was originally named Malinvernia anserina Rabenhorst (1857) and Podospora anserina was subsequently published in Niessl von Mayendorf, G. 1883: Ueber die Theilung der Gattung Sordaria. Hedwigia 22: 153–156, which is used today to reference the common laboratory strain therefrom, namely, 'Niessl'. It is also known as Pleurage anserina (Ces.) Kuntze. Genetics of P. anserina were characterized in Rizet and Engelmann (1949) and reviewed by Esser (1974). P. anserina is estimated to have diverged from Neurospora crassa 75 million years ago based on 18S rRNA and protein orthologous share 60-70% homology. 
Gene cluster orthologs between Aspergillus nidulans and Podospora anserina have 63% identical primary amino acid sequence (even those these species are from distinct classes) and the average amino acid of compared proteomes is 10% less, giving rise to hypotheses of distinct species yet shared genes.

Research 
Podospora is a model organism to study genetics, aging (senescence, cell degeneration), ascomycete development, heterokaryon incompatibility, mating in fungi, prions, and mitochondrial and peroxisomal physiology. Podospora is easily culturable (for example, on/in complex (full) potato dextrose or cornmeal agar/broth or even synthetic medium), and, using modern molecular tools, is easy to manipulate. Its optimal growth temperature is 25-27 °C and can complete its life cycle in 7 to 11 days under laboratory conditions.

Strains 
Most research has been done in a small collection of French strains sampled in the 20s, in particular the strains named S and s. These two strains are known to be very similar except for the het-s locus. The reference genome published in 2008 corresponds to S+, that is, the haploid derivate of the S strain with a + mating type.

In addition, two other populations have been sampled, namely in Usingen, Germany, and in Wageningen, the Netherlands, both of which have been used to study spore killing, the phenotypic expression of meiotic drive in fungi.

In addition there are multiple lab-derived strains:

 ΔPaKu70 is used to increase homologous recombination in protoplasts during transformations in order to create desirable gene deletions or allelic mutations. A ΔPaKu70 strain can be achieved by transforming protoplasts with linear DNA that flanks the PaKu70 gene along with an antibiotic cassette and then selecting for strains and verifying by PCR. Derived from the s strain.
 Mn19 is a long-lived strain used to study senescence. It is derived from strain A+-84-11 after grown on manganese (Mn). This particular strain has been reported to have lived over 2 years in a race tube covering over 400 cm of vegetative growth.
 ΔiΔviv is an immortal strain that shows no sign of senescence. It produces yellow pigmentation. Lack of viv increased life span in days by a factor of 2.3 compared to the wild type and lack of i by 1.6, however, strain ΔiΔviv showed no senescence during the whole study and was vegetative for over a year. These genes are synergistic and are physically closely linked.
 AL2 is a long-lived strain. Insertion of linear mitochondrial plasmid containing al-2 show increased life span. However, natural isolates that have homology to al-2 do not show increased life span.
 Δgrisea is a long-lived strain and copper uptake mutant. This strain has lower affinity to copper and thus lower intracellular copper levels, leading to use of the cyanide-resistant alternative oxidase, PaAOX, pathway (instead of copper-dependent mitochondrial cytochrome c oxidase (COX) complex). This strain also exhibits more stable mtDNA. Copper use is similar to Δex1 strain.
 Δex1 is an 'immortal strain' that has been grown for over 12 years and still shows no signs of senescence. This strain respires via a cyanide-resistant, salicylhydroxamic acid (SHAM)-sensitive pathway. This deletion disrupts the COX complex.

Aging 
Podospora anserina has a definite life span and shows senescence phenotypically (by slower growth, less aerial hyphae, and increased pigment production in distal hyphae). However, isolates show either increased life span or immortality. To study the process of aging many genetic manipulations to produce immortal strains or increase life-span have been done. In general, the mitochondrion and mitochondrial chromosome is investigated (note that animals, closely related to fungi, contain similar organelles like mitochondria). This is because during respiration reactive oxygen species are produced that limit the life span and over time defective mitochondrial DNA can accumulate. With this knowledge, much focus turned to nutrition availability, respiration (ATP synthesis) and oxidases, like cytochrome c oxidase. Carotenoids, pigments also found in plants and provide health benefits to humans, are known to be in fungi like Podospora's divergent ancestor Neurospora crassa. In N. crassa (and other fungi) cartenoids al genes, namely focused provide UV radiation protection. Overexpressed of al-2 Podospora anserina increased life span by 31%. Calorie restriction studies show that decreased nutrition, like sugar, increase life span (likely due to slower metabolism and thus decreased reactive oxygen species production or induced survival genes). Also, intracellular copper levels were found to be correlated with growth. This was studied in Grisea-deleted and ex1-deleted strains, as well as in a wild type s strain. Podospora without Grisea, a cooper transcription factor, had decreased intracellular copper levels which lead to use of an alternative respiratory pathway that consequently produced less oxidative stress.

Heterokaryon incompatibility 
The following genes, both allelic and nonallelic, are found to be involved in vegetative incompatibility (only those cloned and characterized are listed): het-c, het-c, het-s, idi-2, idi-1, idi-3, mod-A, mode-D, mod-E, psp-A.  Podospora anserina contains at least 9 het loci.

Enzymes 
Podospora anserina is known to produce laccases, a type of phenoloxidase.

Genetics 
Original genetic studies by gel electrophoresis led to the finding of the genome size, ca. 35 megabases, with 7 chromosomes and 1 mitochondrial chromosome. In the 1980s the mitochondrial chromosome was sequenced. Then in 2003 a pilot study was initiated to sequence regions bordering chromosome V's centromere using BAC clones and direct sequencing. In 2008, a 10x whole genome draft sequence was published. The genome size is now estimated to be 35-36 megabases  Genetic manipulation in fungi is difficult due to low homologous recombination efficiency and ectopic integrations (insertion of gene at undesirable location) and thus a hindrance in genetic studies (allele replacement and knockouts).  Although in 2005, a method for gene deletion (knock-outs) was developed based on a model for Aspergillus nidulans that involved cosmid plasmid transformation, a better system for Podospora was developed in 2008 by using a strain that lacked nonhomologous end joining proteins (Ku (protein), known in Podospora as PaKu70). This method claimed to have 100% of transformants undergo desired homologous recombination leading to allelic replacement (after the transformation, the PaKu70 deletion can be restored by crossing over with a wild-type strain to yield progeny with only the targeted gene deletion or allelic exchange (e.g. point mutation)).

Secondary metabolites 
It is well known that many organisms across all domains produce secondary metabolites. Fungi are known to be prolific in this regard. Product mining was well underway in the 1990s for the genus Podospora. Specifically for Podospora anserina, two new natural products classified as pentaketides, specifically derivatives of benzoquinones, were discovered; these showed antifungal, antibacterial, and cytotoxic activities. Horizontal gene transfer is common in bacteria and between prokaryotes and eukaryotes yet is more rare between eukaryotic organisms. Between fungi, secondary metabolite clusters are good candidates for HGT. For example, a functional ST gene cluster that produces sterigmatocystin was found in Podospora anserina and originally derived from Aspergillus. This cluster is well-conserved, notably the transcription-factor binding sites. Sterigmatocystin itself is toxic and is a precursor to another toxic metabolite, aflatoxin.

See also 
 Fungal prions
 PXMP3
 Virus classification
 OLIGO Primer Analysis Software
 Point mutation
 Amyloid

References

External links 
 
 

Lasiosphaeriaceae
Taxa named by Gottlob Ludwig Rabenhorst
Fungi described in 1857
Model organisms